14 Seksistowskich Piosenek (14 Sexist Songs) is the first album released by Polish punk rock band Anti Dread.

Track listing

Personnel
Paweł Czekała – guitar
Paweł Boguszewski – drums
Piotr Półtorak – Vocals
Błażej Halski – guitar
Kefir – bass guitar

External links
  Anti Dread official website
  Jimmy Jazz Records

2005 debut albums
Anti Dread albums
Polish-language albums
Jimmy Jazz Records albums